Municipal elections were held in South Africa in 1995 and 1996. Over 11 000 seats were contested of which the African National Congress won 6 032, the National Party 1 814, the Inkhata Freedom Party 754 and the Democratic Party 138.

The elections were held on 1 November 1995 in most of the country, but delayed to 29 May 1996 in the Western Cape and 26 June 1996 in KwaZulu-Natal due to boundary demarcation disputes.

References 

1995
November 1995 events in Africa
1995 elections in South Africa
1996 elections in South Africa
May 1996 events in Africa